Oakland College may refer to:

Oakland College (Mississippi), a defunct private college near Rodney, Mississippi
Oakland Community College, a community college in Oakland County, Michigan
Oakland Early College, a five-year Early College High School in Oakland County, Michigan
Oakland Normal Institute, a private school in Yale, Mississippi

See also
Oakland University, a public university in central Oakland County, Michigan
Oaklands College, a further education college in Hertfordshire, England
Laney College, formerly Oakland City College, in Oakland, California
De La Salle College (Toronto), once known as Oaklands, in Toronto, Ontario